Thomas Eyre (died 1628), was an English politician.

He was a Member (MP) of the Parliament of England for Salisbury in 1597.

References

16th-century births
1628 deaths
English MPs 1597–1598